Ormerod is a surname. Notable people with the surname include:

Anthony Ormerod (born 1979), Irish footballer
Brett Ormerod (born 1976), English footballer
Edward Ormerod (1834–1894), English mining engineer
Eleanor Anne Ormerod (1828–1901), English entomologist
George Ormerod (1785–1873), English antiquary and historian
Jan Ormerod (1946–2013), Australian illustrator
Joseph Arderne Ormerod (1846–1925), English physician
Katie Ormerod (born 1997), English snowboarder
Nick Ormerod (born 1951), British theatre designer
Paul Ormerod (born 1969), economist
Peter Ormerod (born 1950), chest physician
Sam Ormerod (1848–1906), English footballer, referee and manager

See also
Ormrod
Ormerod Pearse